The 2017 North Queensland Cowboys season was the 23rd in the club's history. Coached by Paul Green and co-captained by Johnathan Thurston and Matthew Scott, they competed in the NRL's 2017 Telstra Premiership. The club became just the second 8th-placed side to make the Grand Final, ultimately losing to the Melbourne Storm.

Season summary

Milestones
 Round 1: Ben Hampton made his debut for the club.
 Round 2: Johnathan Thurston scored his 2,000th point.
 Round 3: Shaun Fensom made his debut for the club.
 Round 3: Kane Linnett played his 150th NRL game.
 Round 4: Kyle Feldt played his 50th game for the club.
 Round 4: Gideon Gela-Mosby made his NRL debut.
 Round 4: Gideon Gela-Mosby and Kalyn Ponga scored their first NRL tries.
 Round 5: Shaun Fensom scored his first try for the club.
 Round 7: Corey Jensen made his NRL debut.
 Round 11: Ben Hampton scored his first try for the club.
 Round 15: Kyle Laybutt made his NRL debut.
 Round 16: Gavin Cooper played his 250th NRL game.
 Round 17: Te Maire Martin made his debut for the club.
 Round 17: Te Maire Martin scored his first try for the club.
 Round 17: Shaun Fensom played his 150th NRL game.
 Round 21: Braden Uele made his NRL debut.
 Round 21: Paul Green coached his 100th NRL game.
 Round 22: Lachlan Coote played his 150th NRL game.
 Round 23: Patrick Mago made his NRL debut.
 Round 23: Michael Morgan scored his 50th try for the club.
 Round 24: Scott Bolton played his 200th game for the club.
 Round 24: Enari Tuala and Shane Wright made their NRL debuts.
 Finals Week 2: Kane Linnett played his 150th game for the club.
 Finals Week 2: John Asiata scored his first NRL try.
 Finals Week 3: Antonio Winterstein played his 150th game for the club.
 Finals Week 3: The club qualified for their third Grand Final.

Squad

Squad movement

Gains

Losses

Re-signings

Ladder

Fixtures

NRL Auckland Nines

The NRL Auckland Nines is a pre-season rugby league nines competition featuring all 16 NRL clubs.

Pool Play

Pre-season

Regular season

Finals

Statistics

Representatives
The following players have played a representative match in 2017.

Honours

League
Dally M Halfback of the Year: Michael Morgan
Dally M Try of the Year: Kyle Feldt
Dally M NYC Player of the Year: Jake Clifford
NYC Team of the Year: Jake Clifford, Kalyn Ponga

Club
Paul Bowman Medal: Jason Taumalolo
Players' Player: Michael Morgan and Jason Taumalolo
Coach's Award: Michael Morgan
Member's Player of the Year: Michael Morgan
Club Person of the Year: Scott Bolton and Ray Thompson
Rookie of the Year: Corey Jensen
NYC Player of the Year: Kurt Wiltshire
Townsville Bulletins' Fan Choice Award: Michael Morgan

Feeder clubs

National Youth Competition
 North Queensland Cowboys - 5th, lost elimination final

Queensland Cup
 Mackay Cutters - 8th, missed finals
 Northern Pride - 12th, missed finals
 Townsville Blackhawks - 6th, lost elimination final

References

North Queensland Cowboys seasons
North Queensland Cowboys season